Fethia Hechmi (b. 1955) is a Tunisian novelist. She published her first collection of poems entitled al-Uqḥuwān al-maṣlūb alā al-shifah in 2002, and her first novel Ḥāfiyat al-rūḥ (novel) in 2002. Her 2009 novel Maryam tasquṭ min yadd Allāh has been recognized for its experimental style. She was active in the 2011 Tunisian revolution and has been a prominent voice on Tunisian politics since then.

Works

Novels 

 (2005) Ḥāfiyat al-rūḥ ( (Bare-footed soul))
 (2007) Minnah Mawwāl
 (2009) Maryam tasquṭ min yadd Allāh ( (Maryam falls from the hand of God))
 (2016) al-ʿAnkabūt lā yaḥrus al-ʾanbiyāʾ dāʾiman ( (The spider does not always guard prophets))

Poetry 

 (2002) al-Uqḥuwān al-maṣlūb alā al-shifah ( (A daisy crucified on lips))

Short Story Collections 

 (2012) al-Shayṭān yaʿūd min al-manfā ( (Satan returns from exile))

Prizes 

 (2009) Credif Prize for Best Writing by a Tunisian Woman

References 

Living people
1955 births
Tunisian novelists
Arabic-language novelists
21st-century Tunisian women writers
21st-century Tunisian writers